Afamefuna Klint Igwemba (born 3 March 1975) popularly known as Klint da Drunk is a Nigerian comedian, actor, musician, Painter, Gadget Lover and dancer.

Filmography

References

External links 

Living people
1975 births
Nigerian male actors
Nigerian male comedians
Nigerian dancers
Nigerian musicians